This page is a page of Alternative for Germany election results.

Tables of election results 

Federal Parliament (Bundestag)

European Parliament

Hesse
State Parliament (Landtag)

Saxony
State Parliament (Landtag)

Thuringia
State Parliament (Landtag)

Brandenburg
State Parliament (Landtag)

Hamburg
State Parliament (Landtag)

Bremen
State Parliament (Landtag)

Baden-Württemberg
State Parliament (Landtag)

Rhineland-Palatinate
State Parliament (Landtag)

Saxony-Anhalt
State Parliament (Landtag)

Mecklenburg-Vorpommern
State Parliament (Landtag)

Berlin
State Parliament (Landtag)

Saarland
State Parliament (Landtag)

Lower Saxony
State Parliament (Landtag)

Bavaria
State Parliament (Landtag)

North Rhine-Westphalia
State Parliament (Landtag)

References

Alternative for Germany